Nikolai Nesterovich Demchenko (21 May 1896 – 30 October 1937) was a Ukrainian communist and Soviet politician. Executed during the Great Purge, he was rehabilitated during the Khrushchev Thaw.

Early years
He was born in Lebedyn, Kharkov Governorate, now the Sumy Oblast, Ukraine, to a bourgeois family. In 1915, he graduated from the gymnasium in Lebedyn. He studied medicine at Kharkiv University, graduating in March 1917.

Soviet career
Demchenko had already become a member of the Bolshevik Party in 1916. He held a number of different positions in the following years, becoming a candidate member of the Central Committee of the CP(b)U in May 1924, a member of the Central Control Commission of the CP(b)U in December 1925, a member of the Central Committee of the CP(b)U in November 1927, a member of the Organizational Bureau of the Central Committee of the CP(b)U in November 1927, a candidate member of the Politburo in June 1928, a member of the Politburo of the Central Committee of the CP(b)U in March 1931, and a candidate member of the Central Committee of the CPSU(b) in February 1934. He was the People's Commissar of Agriculture of the Ukrainian SSR from December 1929 to January 1932, playing an active part in collectivization. He received the Order of Lenin on 20 December 1935.

Arrest, execution and rehabilitation
During the Great Purge, he was arrested on 22 July 1937, sentenced to death by the Military Collegium of the Supreme Court of the USSR on 29 October 1937 and executed by firing squad the next day. After the death of Joseph Stalin, he was rehabilitated.

References 

1896 births
1937 deaths
People from Lebedyn
People from Kharkov Governorate
Bolsheviks
Central Committee of the Communist Party of the Soviet Union candidate members
People's commissars and ministers of the Soviet Union
Politburo of the Central Committee of the Communist Party of Ukraine (Soviet Union) members
Land cultivation ministers of Ukraine
Recipients of the Order of Lenin
People executed by the Soviet Union
People executed by firing squad
Great Purge victims from Ukraine
Soviet rehabilitations